Nikola Jerkan (born 8 December 1964) is a Croatian former footballer who played as a defender. Jerkan was born in Split and started playing football professionally for NK Zagreb.

Playing career

Club
He started his career in youth ranks of Junak Sinj. In 1982 he moved to NK Zagreb where he played until 1986. Then, he moved to Dinamo Vinkovci where he would spend two years before moving to Hajduk Split in 1988.  Immediately he started playing for the first team and played two seasons before he moved to Real Oviedo in Spain in 1990. In 1991, in his second season there, he was selected for the best defender of La Liga.

Jerkan joined Nottingham Forest in the summer of 1996 for a fee of £1million. Jerkan's time at Nottingham Forest was disappointing. He struggled to hold down a first-team place and after the departures of Frank Clark and Stuart Pearce, never hit it off with new manager Dave Bassett.

He went on a year-long loan to Rapid Vienna of Austria at the start of the 1997-98 season and was never seen in the English game again. He spent the 1998/99 season at the City Ground but played no games.

In 1999, he moved Charleroi where he played during the next two seasons, and then retired. He then moved to live in Oviedo.

International
Jerkan made his debut for Croatia in a July 1992 friendly match away against Australia and attained 31 caps, scoring one goal (against Lithuania in Zagreb during the qualifications for Euro 96). He played three games at the Euro 96 and was at that point established in the centre of the Croatian defence. His final international was a June 1997 Kirin Cup match against Turkey.

Managerial career
Jerkan managed Real Avilés B for two seasons, securing the club's first ever promotion to the Tercera División (fourth tier). He also was assistant manager to Zlatko Dalić for Croatia at UEFA Euro 2020.

Honours

Orders
Order of Danica Hrvatska with face of Franjo Bučar - 1995

References

External links
 
 
 
 

1964 births
Living people
Footballers from Split, Croatia
Association football central defenders
Yugoslav footballers
Croatian footballers
Croatia international footballers
UEFA Euro 1996 players
NK Zagreb players
HNK Cibalia players
HNK Hajduk Split players
Real Oviedo players
Nottingham Forest F.C. players
SK Rapid Wien players
R. Charleroi S.C. players
Yugoslav First League players
La Liga players
Premier League players
Austrian Football Bundesliga players
Belgian Pro League players
Yugoslav expatriate footballers
Expatriate footballers in Spain
Yugoslav expatriate sportspeople in Spain
Croatian expatriate footballers
Croatian expatriate sportspeople in Spain
Expatriate footballers in England
Croatian expatriate sportspeople in England
Expatriate footballers in Austria
Croatian expatriate sportspeople in Austria
Expatriate footballers in Belgium
Croatian expatriate sportspeople in Belgium